Murano is a series of islands linked by bridges in the Venetian Lagoon, northern Italy.

Murano may also refer to:

Nissan Murano, an automobile
Murano (restaurant), a restaurant in Mayfair, London, England
Murano (skyscraper), a skyscraper in Center City, Philadelphia, Pennsylvania, United States
Murano, Toronto, a skyscraper in Toronto, Ontario, Canada
Murano (surname)
Murano Station, a railway station in Hirakata, Osaka Prefecture, Japan
Murano glass

Similar spelling
Marano (disambiguation)
Merano (disambiguation)